Franck Lestage (born 20 April 1968) is a French athlete. He competed in the men's long jump at the 1992 Summer Olympics.

References

1968 births
Living people
Sportspeople from Saint-Germain-en-Laye
Athletes (track and field) at the 1992 Summer Olympics
French male long jumpers
Olympic athletes of France